Pawtugi Yazawin is a Burmese chronicle that covers the history of the Portuguese, especially their rule at Syriam (Thanlyin) from 1599 to 1613. The oral history was first compiled in the early 19th century by Father Ignacio de Brito and Johannes Moses (Baba Sheen). It was first published in 1918 in Yangon.

It is the first and only chronicle to claim that Natshinnaung converted to Roman Catholicism.

Notes

References

Bibliography
 
   

Burmese chronicles